The Manigotagan River is a whitewater river located in southeastern Manitoba, Canada.  The river flows into the eastern side of Lake Winnipeg and it is a rare remote river of southern Canada. Situated at the river's mouth, on the shore of Lake Winnipeg, is the community of Manigotagan.

The last southern herd of woodland caribou in Canada can be found near this river and in Nopiming Provincial Park. Logging roads and overdevelopment can potentially threaten the important habitat and ecology of this area. The river is popular for canoeing, and is close to the many remote and pristine rivers along the east side of Lake Winnipeg. These eastern rivers in Manitoba are the last undeveloped rivers in Southern Canada.

The river is surrounded by Manigotagan River Provincial Park, which was designated as a provincial park by the Government of Manitoba in 2004.

In 2008, the Manitoba Eco-Network's mapping centre launched a new GIS map of the river, along with a website. It is a unique map and website combination that details all the features along the river, and it is a first of its kind in Canada for a river map.

See also
 Poplar River 
 Bloodvein River
 Berens River
 Rivers of Manitoba

References

External links
 Manigotagan River Canoe Route

Rivers of Manitoba

Bodies of water of Eastman Region, Manitoba